Marimatha quadrata is a moth of the family Noctuidae first described by Clifford D. Ferris and J. Donald Lafontaine in 2010. It is found from western Texas and Arizona and southward to southern Mexico (Sinaloa).

Adults are on wing from mid-May to mid-September.

Etymology
The species name is derived from quadratus (four-cornered) in reference to the quadrangular process on the dorsal margin of the male valva.

External links

Noctuinae